Derevnya stantsii Kabakovo (Qabak stantsiyahı) is a rural locality (a village) in Kabakovsky Selsoviet, Karmaskalinsky District, Bashkortostan, Russia. The population was 105 as of 2010. There is 1 street.

Geography 
The village is located 31 km north of Karmaskaly (the district's administrative centre) by road. Nizhnetimkino is the nearest rural locality.

References 

Rural localities in Karmaskalinsky District